The Unit is an American drama television series. It began airing on CBS on March 7, 2006, in the United States, as a mid-season replacement. Created by David Mamet, The Unit follows a top-secret United States Army special forces team and their missions abroad, in addition to the effect their careers have on their wives and girlfriends. The Unit began its first season on March 7, 2006 and concluded on May 16, 2006; the second season debuted on September 19, 2006 and completed on May 8, 2007. The third season started on September 25, 2007, with a hiatus occurring after the 11th episode due to 2007–08 Writers Guild of America strike. The show was picked up for a fourth season by CBS on May 12, 2008. The fourth season began on September 28, 2008 and ended on May 10, 2009, which was also the series finale as the show was not renewed for a fifth season. A total of 69 episodes of the series aired.

The first three seasons have been released to Region 1 DVD by 20th Century Fox in the form of individual season box sets, which include deleted scenes, behind-the-scenes featurettes, and commentaries. 20th Century Fox has also released both sets to Region 2 DVD in the United Kingdom. Season four was released to Region 1 on September 29, 2009 and was released on February 22, 2010 in Region 2.

Series overview

Episodes

Season 1 (2006)

Season 2 (2006–07)

Season 3 (2007)

Season 4 (2008–09)

Explanatory notes

References

External links 
 
 
 
 

Lists of American action television series episodes
The Unit